Adrian Stańczak (born 17 February 1987) is a Polish volleyball player.

Career

Clubs
In 2012 AZS Częstochowa, including Stańczak, won CEV Challenge Cup after final with AZS Politechnika Warszawska (3-2). In 2016 he moved to GKS Katowice.

Sporting achievements
 CEV Challenge Cup
  2011/2012 – with AZS Czestochowa
 National team
 2005  CEV U19 European Championship

Individually
 2005: CEV U19 European Championship – Best Libero

References

External links
 PlusLiga player profile

1987 births
Living people
People from Radom
Sportspeople from Masovian Voivodeship
Polish men's volleyball players
Czarni Radom players
Jadar Radom players
AZS Częstochowa players
Ślepsk Suwałki players